The 1927 Currie Cup was the 15th edition of the Currie Cup, the premier domestic rugby union competition in South Africa.

See also

 Currie Cup

References

1927
1927 in South African rugby union
Currie